The Earth Institute is a research institute at Columbia University that was established in 1995. Its stated mission is to address complex issues facing the planet and its inhabitants, with a focus on sustainable development. With an interdisciplinary approach, this includes research in climate change, geology, global health, economics, management, agriculture, ecosystems, urbanization, energy, hazards, and water. The Earth Institute's activities are guided by the idea that science and technological tools that already exist could be applied to greatly improve conditions for the world's poor, while preserving the natural systems that support life on Earth.

The Earth Institute supports pioneering projects in the biological, engineering, social, and health sciences, while actively encouraging interdisciplinary projects—often combining natural and social sciences—in pursuit of solutions to real world problems and a sustainable planet. In its work, the Earth Institute remains mindful of the staggering disparities between rich and poor nations, and the tremendous impact that global-scale problems—such as the HIV/AIDS pandemic, climate change and extreme poverty—have on all nations.

Research Units

Lamont–Doherty Earth Observatory (LDEO)

Lamont–Doherty Earth Observatory was established in 1949 and is a world-class research institution specializing in the Earth sciences. LDEO conducts research on all aspects of the planet both above and below ground, on land and sea, with topics that include earthquakes, volcanoes, global climate change, resources, and environmental hazards. The current interim director of Lamont is Maureen Raymo.

Advanced Consortium on Cooperation, Conflict, and Complexity (AC4) 
AC4 strives to foster sustainable peace through innovation and integration. The center works to enable and support integrative research and practice on sustainable peace, constructive conflict engagement, and sustainable development. AC4's current director is Joshua Fisher who joined in 2014. The center is organized around four focus areas: Complexity, Peace and Sustainability; Environment, Peace, and Sustainability; Youth, Peace and Security; and Women, Peace and Security which is led by Nobel Laureate Leymah Gbowee as executive director.

Center for Climate and Life

The Center for Climate and Life is a multidisciplinary climate science research initiative based at Lamont–Doherty Earth Observatory. The center advances research focused on how climate change affects access to basic resources such as food, water, shelter and energy. The center's founder and director is Peter B. de Menocal, a paleoclimatologist and Columbia University Dean of Science in the Faculty of Arts and Sciences.

Center for Climate Systems Research (CCSR)
Established in 1994, the Center for Climate Systems Research is a key Earth Institute center that has 25+ scientists and staff researching the Earth's climate. As Columbia's Gateway to NASA and Beyond, the center has a special relationship with the NASA Goddard Institute for Space Studies, as it is co-located with GISS in Columbia University's Armstrong Hall above Tom's Restaurant in New York City. Here, Columbia and NASA scientists jointly work together to gain a greater understanding of climate sensitivity and variability including the forcing and feedback mechanisms that influence climate, particularly with regard to how this can impact humanity and environmental stability. The director of CCSR is Dr. Michael J. Puma.

Columbia Water Center (CWC)

The Columbia Water Center was founded in 2008 and is looking into the assessment, understanding and resolution of the global crisis of water scarcity. The center aims to design reliable, sustainable models of water management and development that can be implemented on local, regional and global levels. The Columbia Water Center conducts projects both domestically and internationally, with projects currently underway in India, Mali, Brazil, and China. The current director of CWC is Upmanu Lall.

Center for Rivers and Estuaries
The Center for River and Estuaries is focused on the better understanding of rivers and estuaries worldwide. This includes the distribution, transport, and flux of contaminants, sediments, nutrients, organic material, carbon, and aerosols. The center also studies the evolution and linkage of marshes and wetlands.

The center is divided into three main areas of research: maintenance of the Hudson River and New York Harbor, finding solutions to use the water system without harming the ecosystems of the watershed, and maintaining the diverse estuary fisheries for commercial and recreational use.

Earth Institute Center for Environmental Sustainability (EICES)
 
The Earth Institute Center for Environmental Sustainability (EICES), formerly known as the Center for Environmental Research and Conservation (CERC), has been actively involved in protecting biodiversity and ecosystems. The Earth Institute Center for Environmental Sustainability is dedicated to the development of a rich, robust and vibrant world within which we can secure a sustainable future. Through a diverse array of strategic partners in science, education and outreach, the center builds unique programs that promote human well-being through the preservation, restoration and management of biodiversity and the services our ecosystems provide.

The Earth Engineering Center (EEC)
The Earth Engineering Center was established in 1996 and serves as the principal engineering unit of the Earth Institute. The EEC aims to find solutions to achieve sustainable development of Earth's resources including water, energy, minerals, materials, and the environment at large. It includes over 20 members of the Engineering School faculty at Columbia and specialists from other Columbia schools as well as environmental organizations and other universities. The EEC is a part of the Henry Krumb School of Mines and linked to the earth and environmental engineering department. Its current director is Professor Nickolas Themelis.

Lenfest Center for Sustainable Energy (LCSE)
The mission of the Lenfest Center for Sustainable Energy (LCSE) is to advance science and develop innovative technologies that provide sustainable energy for all humanity while maintaining the stability of the Earth’s natural systems. Lenfest research areas include advanced fuel concepts, carbon sequestration, and small scale energy conversion systems (e.g., Fischer–Tropsch process). The current director is Ah-Hyung (Alissa) Park.

The Center for Sustainable Development (CSD)
The Center for Sustainable Development is a research unit of The Earth Institute of Columbia University charged with managing social science activities. The mission of CGSD is to apply social science approaches to international development problems. The center collaborates with the faculty of the social science departments of Columbia University and is primarily focused on interdisciplinary research and policy application. The center is operated on the principle that solutions must cross many disciplines because the problems do as well, including the environment, public health, disaster preparedness, and economic planning.

The Center for the Study of Science and Religion (CSSR)

The Center for the Study of Science and Religion is a collaborative forum designed to examine the 
issues "lying at the boundary of scientific and religious ways of comprehending the world." CSSR works across disciplines and schools in an effort to have social scientists incorporate religion and rituals in the modeling and prediction of human behavior, particularly in the areas of social planning, research and policy. The director is Robert Pollack.

The Center on Capitalism and Society
The Center on Capitalism and Society seeks to determine the means by which a country can successfully achieve economic success through its ability to generate and develop sound commercial ideas. The center's work is based upon a theory of capitalism where entrepreneurs and financiers are the key actors and the discovery of viable ideas is the essential activity. The director is Professor of Economics and Nobel-Laureate Edmund Phelps.

The Center for Sustainable Urban Development (CSUD)
The Center for Sustainable Urban Development was established in 2004 by the Volvo Research and Education Foundations and seeks the creation of sustainable cities, both physically and socially. The center's first project was to develop land use and transport planning in developing countries that promote sustainable growth. The director is Elliott Sclar.

Center for International Earth Science Information Network (CIESIN)
The Center for International Earth Science Information Network was established in 1989 as an independent NGO to research the interaction between man and the environment. In 1998, CIESIN became part of the Columbia University Earth Institute. Offices are located at the Lamont–Doherty Earth Observatory in Palisades, New York. CIESIN provides a large amount of data and information about the Earth to meet the needs of both scientists and decision makers by means of education, consultation, and training. The center is focused on applying modern information technology towards many research problems to meet this goal. Specifically CIESIN was one of the first groups that developed and provided interactive Informatics tools using the internet. The current Office of Directors include director Robert S. Chen, Deputy Directory Marc Levy, and Communications Coordinator Elisabeth Sydor.

International Research Institute for Climate and Society (IRI)
The International Research Institute for Climate and Society was established in 1996 and became part of the Earth Institute in 2005. The IRI's mission is to enhance society's capability to understand, anticipate and manage the impacts of climate in order to improve human welfare and the environment, especially in developing countries. (see Effects of global warming) The IRI conducts this mission through strategic and applied research, education, capacity building, and by providing forecasts and information products, with an emphasis on practical and verifiable utility and partnership. The institute was directed by Lisa Goddard who led efforts to forecast climate change.

The Center for Hazards and Risk Research (CHRR)
The Center for Hazards and Risk Research is focused on hazard assessment and risk management by advancing predictive capability and integrating core sciences to that effort. Physical and social scientists work to reduce impacts on society from hazards, both natural and man-made. Its director is Art Lerner-Lam.

National Center for Disaster Preparedness
The National Center for Disaster Preparedness's mission is to understand and improve the nation's ability to prepare for, respond and recover from disasters with a special interest in vulnerable populations. The center is an academic center which focuses on the areas of research, policy, and practice. The center's 20 affiliated faculty represent a broad range of expertise in multiple disciplines including, public health, medicine, engineering, nursing, and The Earth Institute. The center is led by Irwin Redlener.

Programs of the Earth Institute

Earth Institute Initiative on Communication and Sustainability 
The Earth Institute Initiative on Communication and Sustainability works to boost the capacity of scientists, journalists, educators, students and citizens to communicate in ways that can speed progress toward a more sustainable relationship between our species, our planet and each other.

Climate Science, Awareness and Solutions 
The aim of the program Climate Science, Awareness and Solutions is to help people understand global climate change — and how the factors that drive climate are changing. They are working to continue to “connect the dots” from advancing basic climate science to promoting public awareness to advocating policy actions. The research areas that the team intends to focus on are as follows:

 Data on Ongoing Climate Variability and Change
 Global Climate Forcings and Planetary Energy Balance
 Earth’s Climate History and Climate Sensitivity
 Climate Dynamics
 Energy Choices and CO2 Emissions

Program on Child Well-Being and Resilience 
The Program on Child Well-Being and Resilience will serve as an academic center for Columbia University faculty and researchers, across various academic departments and schools, to support greater understanding of the issues, challenges, and opportunities involving children and youth.

Program on Sustainability Policy and Management 
The Research Program on Sustainability Policy and Management researches public policy, management and financial tools that can enable organizations to incorporate the physical dimensions of sustainability into routine organizational decision making.

Joint Units of the Earth Institute
The following unites were established jointly by the Earth Institute and another entity

Center for Research on Environmental Decisions (CRED)
The Center for Research on Environmental Decisions was established under the National Science Foundation's Decision Making Under Uncertainty (DMUU) program. CRED serves to research decision making under climate uncertainty and environmental risk. The center's objectives include promoting scientific information and communication for a collective response to climate change and variability. CRED is also affiliated with the Institute for Social and Economic Research and Policy (ISERP). Its directors are David Krantz, Elke Weber, Benjamin Orlove, and Kenneth Broad.

Laboratory of Populations
The Laboratory of Populations is a joint venture between Rockefeller University and Columbia that researches populations and their changes, including the spread of disease and social structures. Sciences used to that effort include demography, epidemiology, and statistical modeling to best measure the various changes in populations that are always in flux. Its director is Joel Cohen.

Sabin Center for Climate Change Law
The Sabin Center for Climate Change Law develops legal techniques to fight climate change, trains law students and lawyers in their use, and provides the public with up-to-date resources on key topics in climate law and regulation. It works closely with the scientists at Columbia University's Earth Institute and with governmental, nongovernmental and academic organizations. Its activities are spearheaded by Michael Gerrard, director of the Sabin Center and Andrew Sabin Professor of Professional Practice at Columbia Law School, and Michael Burger, Executive Director of the Sabin Center.

Urban Design Lab

The Urban Design Lab is an interdisciplinary research unit of Columbia University’s Earth Institute in New York City. Established in 2005, it advances design-based solutions to issues in sustainable development and global urbanization. Richard Plunz, founder of the UDL, currently directs the program.

Columbia Centre on Sustainable Investment (CCSI)
The Columbia Centre on Sustainable Investment is a joint center of the Earth Institute and Columbia Law School. CCSI conducts research, performs policy and advisory work, facilitates multi-stakeholder dialogues and teaches about issues related to sustainable investment. In particular, these issues include the sustainability of investments in extractive industries, land and agriculture, their relationship with investment policy and law, and cross-cutting topics such as the relationship between sustainable investment and climate change. CCSI is led by Lisa Sachs.

Affiliates and Consortia
The Earth Institute is a member of or closely affiliated with the below entities.

The Black Rock Forest Consortium
The Black Rock Forest Consortium is a collection of universities, schools, and institutions that operate the  Black Rock Forest in the Hudson Highlands. The forest acts as a field station for research, education, and conservation. Its director is William Schuster.

The Columbia Electrochemical Energy Center (CEEC) (at SEAS) 
The Columbia Electrochemical Energy Center (CEEC) is using a multiscale approach to discover groundbreaking technology and accelerate commercialization. CEEC joins faculty and researchers from across the School of Engineering and Applied Sciences who study electrochemical energy with interests ranging from electrons to devices to systems. Industry partnerships enable the realization of breakthroughs in electrochemical energy storage and conversion. Its co-directors are Alan West and Daniel Steingart.

Center for Environmental Economics and Policy (CEEP) (at SIPA) 
CEEP undertakes original research into the causes of environmental change, the consequences of this change for humanity, and the policies that can prevent and – where possible – reverse harmful environmental change to ensure sustainable development. CEEP’s goal is to share this knowledge with policymakers, fellow researchers, students, and concerned citizens worldwide. A defining feature of the center's research is the integration of analytic approaches from economics with the natural sciences and engineering. Its co-directors are Douglas Almond and Wolfram Schlenker.

Center for Earth Ethics (at Union Theological Seminary) 
The Center for Earth Ethics envisions a world where value is measured according to the sustained well-being of all people and our planet. The center works to cultivate the public consciousness needed to make changes in policy and culture that will establish a new value system that is based on this vision of the world. This mission is advanced through four core programs that complement and connect to each other in all our public programs, academics and movement-building: Eco-ministry; Environmental Justice and Civic Engagement; Original Caretakers; Sustainability and Global Affairs. Its director is Karenna Gore.

Center for the Study of Social Difference (CSSD) (in Arts and Sciences) 
The Center for the Study of Social Difference is an interdisciplinary research center supporting collaborative projects that address gender, race, sexuality, and other forms of inequality to foster ethical and progressive social change. Bringing Arts and Sciences faculty into conversation with faculty from Columbia’s professional schools and Global Centers, along with scholars, artists, writers, and policymakers in the United States and abroad, CSSD deepens Columbia’s partnerships at home and abroad. The center's work has two overarching research themes: Women Creating Change and Imagining Justice. Its co-directors are Paige West and Catherine LaSota.

NASA Goddard Institute for Space Studies (GISS)

The NASA Goddard Institute for Space Studies was established in 1961 as the Goddard Space Flight Center Institute for Space Studies. It is a component laboratory of NASA's Goddard Space Flight Center Earth Sciences Division. Research at GISS emphasizes a broad study of global climate change. Goals include basic research in space sciences in support of Goddard programs. Its director is Gavin Schmidt.

See also
 Cooperative Institute for Climate Applications and Research
 Millennium Cities Initiative
 Millennium Villages Project
 SedDB, online database for sediment geochemistry

References

External links 
The Earth Institute at Columbia University

Research Units
Agriculture and Food Security Center, Columbia University
Lamont–Doherty Earth Observatory (LDEO)
Center for Rivers and Estuaries
Center for Climate Systems Research (CCSR)
Earth Institute Center for Environmental Sustainability (EICES)
The Earth Engineering Center (EEC)
Lenfest Center for Sustainable Energy (LCSE)
The Center for Global Health and Economic Development (CGHED)
The Center for National Health Development in Ethiopia (CNHDE)
The Center on Globalization and Sustainable Development (CGSD)
The Center for the Study of Science and Religion (CSSR)
The Center on Capitalism and Society
The Center for Sustainable Urban Development (CSUD)
Center for International Earth Science Information Network (CIESIN)
International Research Institute for Climate and Society (IRI)
The Center for Hazards and Risk Research (CHRR)
Urban Design Lab (UDL)

Programs of the Earth Institute 

 Earth Institute Initiative on Communication and Sustainability

Research 

 Climate Change, Awareness, and Solutions
 Program on Child Well-Being and Resilience
 Program on Sustainability Policy and Management

Partnership Institutions
The Black Rock Forest Consortium
Center for Research on Environmental Decisions (CRED)
Cooperative Institute for Climate Applications and Research (CICAR)
Goddard Institute for Space Studies (GISS)

Columbia University
Research institutes in New York (state)
Columbia University research institutes
Sustainability organizations
1995 establishments in New York City